Te Puna West is a rural settlement in the Western Bay of Plenty District and Bay of Plenty Region of New Zealand's North Island. It is on a headland on the southern side of Tauranga Harbour, opposite Motuhoa Island, and on the eastern side of Te Puna Estuary, across from Plummers Point. The East Coast Main Trunk forms its southern boundary.

Waitui Reserve is a grassy area with a boat ramp at the point of the headland.

Demographics
It is part of the wider Te Puna statistical area.

Te Puna West had a population of 414 at the 2018 New Zealand census, a decrease of 12 people (−2.8%) since the 2013 census, and an increase of 33 people (8.7%) since the 2006 census. There were 153 households, comprising 201 males and 213 females, giving a sex ratio of 0.94 males per female, with 75 people (18.1%) aged under 15 years, 54 (13.0%) aged 15 to 29, 204 (49.3%) aged 30 to 64, and 78 (18.8%) aged 65 or older.

Ethnicities were 95.7% European/Pākehā, 7.2% Māori, 2.2% Pacific peoples, and 1.4% other ethnicities. People may identify with more than one ethnicity.

Although some people chose not to answer the census's question about religious affiliation, 51.4% had no religion, 36.2% were Christian, 0.7% had Māori religious beliefs, 0.7% were Hindu and 1.4% had other religions.

Of those at least 15 years old, 105 (31.0%) people had a bachelor's or higher degree, and 36 (10.6%) people had no formal qualifications. 99 people (29.2%) earned over $70,000 compared to 17.2% nationally. The employment status of those at least 15 was that 168 (49.6%) people were employed full-time, 63 (18.6%) were part-time, and 9 (2.7%) were unemployed.

References

Western Bay of Plenty District
Populated places in the Bay of Plenty Region
Populated places around the Tauranga Harbour